Eleonore Hendricks (born 1983) is an American actress, photographer and casting director based out of New York City. She has appeared in films such as A Guide to Recognizing Your Saints and Go Get Some Rosemary, as well as films by the Safdie brothers.

After graduating from Smith College, Hendricks served as a casting director. As an actress, she starred in Nancy, Please in 2012. In 2015, she played a title role in Come Down Molly.

Filmography
Feature films
 A Guide to Recognizing Your Saints (2006)
 The House Is Burning (2006)
 The Pleasure of Being Robbed (2008)
 Daddy Longlegs (2009)
 The Dish & the Spoon (2011)
 Bad Fever (2011)
 Nancy, Please (2012)
 Wild Canaries (2014)
 Heaven Knows What (2014)
 Boulevard (2014)
 Stinking Heaven (2015)
 Songs My Brothers Taught Me (2015)
 Come Down Molly (2015)
 When You Finish Saving the World (2022)

References

External links
 
 

1983 births
Living people
American film actresses
American photographers
American women photographers
American casting directors
Women casting directors
Actresses from New York City
21st-century American women